Girolamo Rossi  (fl. Naples 1733–1768) was an Italian composer.

Selected recordings

G. Rossi: Cantata in onore di S. Antonio da Padova & Lectio quarta. Lucia Casagrande Raffi, Elisabetta Pallucchi Rombarocca Ensemble, Lorenzo Tozzi Bongiovanni 2020

References

1768 deaths
Year of birth missing